Terraces can be formed in many ways and in several geologic and environmental settings. By studying the size, shape, and age of terraces, one can determine the geologic processes that formed them.  When terraces have the same age and/or shape over a region, it is often indicative that a large-scale geologic or environmental mechanism is responsible. Tectonic uplift and climate change are viewed as dominant mechanisms that can shape the earth’s surface through erosion. River terraces can be influenced by one or both of these forcing mechanisms and therefore can be used to study variation in tectonics, climate, and erosion, and how these processes interact.

River terrace formation

Long-lived river (fluvial) systems can produce a series of terrace surfaces over the course of their geologic lifetime.  When rivers flood, sediment deposits in sheets across the floodplain and build up over time.  Later, during a time of river erosion, this sediment is cut into, or incised, by the river and flushed downstream.  The previous floodplain is therefore abandoned and becomes a river terrace.  A river terrace is composed of an abandoned surface, or tread, and the incised surface, or riser.   If you can date the age of the terrace tread, one can get an estimate of the age of abandonment of that surface, and the age of incision.  A simple calculation of h1/t1  can give the average rate of incision(ri), where hi = height of river terrace from river and ti = age of surface. It is important to note that these rates of incision assume a constant rate of incision over the entire height and time.

Age of terraces

Time of incision versus time of aggradation
The ages of incision and flooding (aggradation) can have different interpretations for each fluvial system, where each region may respond independently to external variation. Many variables control the behavior of the river and whether it erodes or floods.  Changes in the steepness of the stream gradient, the amount of sediment contained in the river, and the total amount of water flowing through the system, all influence how a river behaves.  There is a delicate equilibrium that controls a river system, which, when disturbed, causes flooding and incising events to occur and produce terracing.

Dating of these abandoned terrace surfaces (treads) is possible using a variety of geochronologic techniques.  The type of technique used, however, is dependent on the composition and age of the terraces.  Currently used techniques are magnetostratigraphy, low temperature thermochronology, cosmogenic nuclides, radiocarbon, thermoluminescence, optically stimulated luminescence, and U-Th disequilibria. Additionally, if there is a succession of preserved fossils, biostratigraphy can be used.

Scale of observation
Scale of observation is always a factor when evaluating tectonic and climatic forcing.  At a glimpse in geologic time, one of these forcing mechanisms may look to be the dominant process.  Observations made on long geologic times scales (≥106annum) typically reveal much about slower, larger-magnitude geologic processes such as tectonism from a regional to even global scale.  Evaluation on geologically short time scales (103-105 a) can reveal much about the relatively shorter climatic cycles, local to regional erosion, and how they could drive terrace development. Regional periods of terrace formation likely mark a time of when stream erosion was much greater than sediment accumulation.  River erosion can be driven by tectonic uplift, climate, or potentially both mechanisms.  It is difficult in many areas, however, to decisively pinpoint whether tectonism or climate change can individually drive tectonic uplift, enhanced erosion, and therefore terrace formation.  In many cases, simplifying the geologic issue to tectonic-driven vs. climate-driven is a mistake because tectonic-climate interactions occur together in a positive feedback cycle.

Climate and terraces

Rivers in continental interiors that have not experienced tectonic activity in the geological recent history likely record climatic changes through terracing.  Terraces record natural, periodic variations driven by cycles such as the Milankovitch cycle.  These cycles can describe how the Earth's orbit and rotational wobble vary over time. The Milankovitch cycles, along with solar forcing, have been determined to drive periodic environmental change on a global scale, namely between glacial and interglacial environments. Each river system will respond to these climate variations on a regional scale. In addition, the regional environment will determine how change in sediment and precipitation will drive river incision and aggradation.  Terraces along the river will record the cyclic changes, where glacial and interglacial time periods are associated with either incision or aggradation.

Tectonic uplift and terraces
In contrast, coastal marine terraces can be preserved only by tectonism or a progressive lowering of sea level. The seismically active coastline of southern California, USA, for example, can be considered an emergent coastline, where tectonism due to transpression provides uplift of shorelines formed during periods of relatively high sea level.  Subsequent wave erosion along uplifted portions of the coastline produces an inset wave cut platform and terrace riser below the abandoned marine terrace surface that formed initially at sea level.  Uplift can therefore lead to a sequence of marine terraces at a few distinct elevations along the coast. Although these surfaces formed at  sea level maxima during interglacial periods, the landforms are preserved solely due to tectonic uplift.

Tectonic–climatic interactions and terraces
Tectonic uplift and climatic factors interact as a positive feedback system, where each forcing mechanism drives the other. One of the greatest examples of this feedback between tectonic and climatic interactions may be preserved in the Himalayan front and in the development of the rain shadow effect and the Asian Monsoon.

The Himalayas act as an orographic barrier that can impede atmospheric circulation and moving air masses. When these air masses try to move up and over the Himalaya, they are forced up against the barrier. The mass condenses as it rises, releasing moisture, which results in precipitation on that flank of the mountains. As the air mass moves over the mountain, it gradually becomes drier until it descends on the other side of the barrier with little moisture left. This effect is known the " rain shadow effect. In the Himalaya, this barrier effect is so great that it was an important environmental factor in developing the Asian Monsoon.

Tectonic uplift during the creation of high mountainous regions can produce incredible surface elevations and therefore exposure of rocks to wind and water. High precipitation can drive enhanced erosion of the exposed rocks and lead to rapid denudation of sediment from the mountains. Buoyancy of the crust, or isostasy, will then drive further tectonic uplift, in order to achieve equilibrium, as sediment is continuously stripped from the top.  Enhanced uplift will then create higher topography, drive increased precipitation which will concentrate erosion, and further uplift.

See also
Tectonic–climatic interaction

References

Climate variability and change
Fluvial landforms
Geomorphology